Capizzone  is a comune (municipality) in the Province of Bergamo in the Italian region of Lombardy, located about  northeast of Milan and about  northwest of Bergamo.

Capizzone borders the following municipalities: Bedulita, Berbenno, Brembilla, Roncola, Strozza, Ubiale Clanezzo.

References